Connor Aspey (born 16 April 2002) is an English professional rugby league footballer who plays as a  for Rochdale Hornets in the RFL League 1.

Club career

Salford Red Devils
In 2020 he made his Salford début in the Super League against Hull Kingston Rovers.

Newcastle Thunder (loan)
On 24 Mar 2021 it was reported that he had signed a short-term loan for the Newcastle Thunder in the RFL Championship.

Rochdale Hornets (loan)
On 4 Nov 2021 it was reported that he had signed for Rochdale Hornets in the RFL League 1 on loan

References

External links
SL profile

2002 births
Living people
English rugby league players
Newcastle Thunder players
North Wales Crusaders players
Rochdale Hornets players
Rugby league players from Wigan
Salford Red Devils players